Than is a Burmese politician who currently serves as incumbent
Speaker of Sagaing Region Hluttaw and Sagaing Region Parliament MP for Katha Township No.1.

Political careers
In the 2015 Myanmar general election, he contested the Sagaing Region Hluttaw from Katha Township No. 1 parliamentary constituency. He was assumed as Sagaing Region Parliament MP on 3 February 2016.

Than also serving as speaker of Sagaing Region Hluttaw.

References

National League for Democracy politicians
1980 births
Living people
People from Sagaing Region